Onebala zulu is a moth in the family Gelechiidae. It was described by Walsingham in 1881. It is found in Namibia, South Africa (KwaZulu-Natal, Gauteng), Gambia and Zimbabwe. The Global Lepidoptera Names Index has this name as a synonym of Onebala lamprostoma.

The wingspan is about 12 mm. The forewings are brownish fuscous, with a white fascia scarcely beyond the middle pointing obliquely outwards from the costa, and sometimes with an excrescence on its inner edge about the middle of the wing. A white triangular costal spot is found before the apex and the apical margin is marked by a slender whitish line, followed by some blackish scales at the base of the cilia. A pale streak runs along the dorsal margin, its upper half whitish, its lower half ferruginous. The hindwings are pale fuscous.

References

Moths described in 1881
Onebala